The Men's Singles tournament of the 2002 Qatar Open tennis championship took place in Doha, Qatar, between 31 December 2001 and 6 January 2002. 32 players from 17 countries competed in the 5-round tournament. The final winner was Younes El Aynaoui of Morocco, who defeated Félix Mantilla of Spain. The defending champion from 2001, Marcelo Ríos, did not compete.

Seeds

  Yevgeny Kafelnikov (quarterfinals)
  Goran Ivanišević (second round)
  Albert Portas (first round)
  Jiří Novák (quarterfinals)
  Bohdan Ulihrach (semifinals)
  Younes El Aynaoui (champion)
  Rainer Schüttler (semifinals)
  Félix Mantilla (final)

Draw

Finals

Top half

Bottom half

External links
 2002 Qatar Open Draw

2002 Qatar Open
Singles
Qatar Open (tennis)